The Leavenworth Case is a 1936 American mystery film directed by Lewis D. Collins and written by Albert DeMond and Sidney Sutherland. It is based on the 1878 novel The Leavenworth Case by Anna Katharine Green. The film stars Donald Cook, Jean Rouverol, Norman Foster, Erin O'Brien-Moore, Maude Eburne and Warren Hymer. The film was released on January 20, 1936, by Republic Pictures.

Plot

Cast
Donald Cook as Dr. Truman Harwell
Jean Rouverol as Eleanore Leavenworth
Norman Foster as Detective Bob Grice
Erin O'Brien-Moore as Mrs. Silas (Gloria) Leavenworth
Maude Eburne as Phoebe Leavenworth
Warren Hymer as Detective O'Malley
Frank Sheridan as Silas Leavenworth
Gavin Gordon as Henry Clavering
Clay Clement as Inspector Holmes
Ian Wolfe as Hudson
Peggy Stratford as Miss Owens
Archie Robbins as Duke
Bess Staffor as The Bulldog Woman
Lucille Ward as The Pekingese Woman
Belle Mitchell as The Cat Woman
Marie Rice as Sarah 
Carl Stockdale as Leavenworth-Clavering Bookkeeper

Production
On November 26, 1935, it was reported Arthur Lubin was directing the film.

References

External links
 

1936 films
1930s English-language films
American mystery films
1936 mystery films
Republic Pictures films
Films directed by Lewis D. Collins
American black-and-white films
1930s American films